Nigel Moore (born September 11, 1981) is an American professional basketball player, who last played for Torpan Pojat of the Finnish First Division.

Early career
Moore attended Joseph C. Wilson Magnet High School. He played four years of high school basketball(one freshman, one junior varsity and two varsity seasons). His junior year he averaged 12 points per game along with 8 rebounds. Senior year he averaged 17ppg 13 rpg and 4bpg. Moore earned an academic scholarship to Alabama A&M University in 1999.

College career
Moore played right away in college as a freshman. Appearing in 27 games, 6.9 mpg. His sophomore season he appeared in 25 games, 16 mpg, starting in 12 of those games. Junior year he played in 29 games averaging 22 minutes per game. Senior year he played in 27 averaging 24 minutes.

Professional career
Moore went on to play professional basketball in Germany directly after college. He played three consecutive years there (two years for TV Lich, and one season for the Giessen 46ers).  2006 in Rochester for the Razorsharks of the ABA. Moore returned to Germany in the following season for Goettingen in the BBL. He left mid-season and He was picked up by Team Componenta in Finland where he helped them stay in the Top League.

Moore then returned to Germany to play for BG Karlsruhe in the 2008–2009 season. Returning to basketball in 2010, Moore played for Korihait in the top league of Finland.

Moore joined Njarðvík of the Icelandic Úrvalsdeild karla five games into the 2012-2013 season. Njarðvík had started the season poorly, winning only one of their first five games but won eleven of their last seventeen after Moore's arrival.
Moore renewed his contract with Njarðvík after the season.

After being released from Njarðvík 11 games into the 2013-2014 season, Moore quickly signed with ÍR who were battling relegation, having only won two of their first eleven games. Moore helped turn ÍR fortunes around, with the team winning seven of their last eleven games and just missing out on the playoffs on a tie-breaker with Snæfell.

References

External links
Finnish leagues statistics
Icelandic league statistics
Profile at proballers.com

1981 births
Living people
Alabama A&M Bulldogs basketball players
American expatriate basketball people in Finland
American expatriate basketball people in France
American expatriate basketball people in Germany
American expatriate basketball people in Iceland
BG Göttingen players
BG Karlsruhe players
Giessen 46ers players
JA Vichy players
Sportspeople from Rochester, New York
Torpan Pojat players
Úrvalsdeild karla (basketball) players
ÍR men's basketball players
Njarðvík men's basketball players
Njarðvík women's basketball coaches
American men's basketball players
Small forwards
Shooting guards